Elections to Southwark Council were held in May 1971.  The whole council was up for election. Turnout was 28.7%.

This election had aldermen as well as councillors. Labour got all ten aldermen as well as 58 elected councillors. The Liberal Party did not contest any seats.

Election result

|}

Ward results

Abbey

Alleyn

Bellenden

Bricklayers

Browning

Brunswick

Burgess

Cathedral

Chaucer

College

Consort

Dockyard

Faraday

Friary

Lyndhurst

Newington

Riverside

Rotherhithe

Ruskin

Rye

St Giles

The Lane

Waverley

References

Council elections in the London Borough of Southwark
1971 London Borough council elections
20th century in the London Borough of Southwark